Arthur William Symons (28 February 186522 January 1945) was a British poet, critic and magazine editor.

Life
Born in Milford Haven, Wales, to Cornish parents, Symons was educated privately, spending much of his time in France and Italy. In 1884–1886, he edited four of Bernard Quaritch's Shakespeare Quarto Facsimiles, and in 1888–1889 seven plays of the "Henry Irving" Shakespeare. He became a member of the staff of the Athenaeum in 1891, and of the Saturday Review in 1894, but his major editorial feat was his work with the short-lived Savoy.

His first volume of verse, Days and Nights (1889), consisted of dramatic monologues. His later verse is influenced by a close study of modern French writers, of Charles Baudelaire, and especially of Paul Verlaine. He reflects French tendencies both in the subject-matter and style of his poems, in their eroticism and their vividness of description. Symons contributed poems and essays to The Yellow Book, including an important piece which was later expanded into The Symbolist Movement in Literature, which would have a major influence on William Butler Yeats and T. S. Eliot. From late 1895 through 1896 he edited, along with Aubrey Beardsley and Leonard Smithers, The Savoy, a literary magazine which published both art and literature. Noteworthy contributors included Yeats, George Bernard Shaw, and Joseph Conrad. Symons was also a member of the Rhymer's Club founded by Yeats in 1890.

In 1892, The Minister's Call, Symons's first play, was produced by the Independent Theatre Society – a private club – to avoid censorship by the Lord Chamberlain's Office.

Symons conducted a long-lasting relationship with a secret lover who has never been identified, commemorated in his book Amoris Victima; in 1901 (19 June) he married Rhoda Bowser, an aspiring actress and eldest daughter of a Newcastle-upon-Tyne shipping magnate.

In 1902, Symons made a selection from his earlier verse, published as Poems. He translated from the Italian of Gabriele D'Annunzio The Dead City (1900) and The Child of Pleasure (1898), and from the French of Émile Verhaeren The Dawn (1898). To The Poems of Ernest Dowson (1905) he prefixed an essay on the deceased poet, who was a kind of English Verlaine and had many attractions for Symons. In 1909 Symons suffered a psychotic breakdown, and published very little new work for a period of more than twenty years. His wife Rhoda took over the management of his affairs. His Confessions: A Study in Pathology (1930) has a moving description of his breakdown and treatment. 

In 1918, Vanity Fair magazine published Symons' Baudelarian essay, "The Gateway to an Artificial Paradise: The Effects of Hashish and Opium Compared." On one occasion between 1889 and 1895, John Addington Symonds, Ernest Dowson, and "some of Symons’ lady friends from the ballet all tried hashish during an afternoon tea given by Symons in his rooms at Fountain Court."

His wife died in Tenterden Kent in 1936; Symons died probably in the same house (Island Cottage, Back Street, Kingsgate) in 1945.

Verse and drama
Days and Nights (1889)
Silhouettes (1892)
The Minister's Call (1892). A Play.
London Nights (1895) a poetry collection including 'To Muriel: At the Opera'
Amoris victima (1897)
Images of Good and Evil (1899)
Poems in 2 volumes (contains: The Loom of Dreams in the second volume, 1901), (1902)
Lyrics (1903): An anthology of poetry published in the US only.
A Book of Twenty Songs (1905)
The Fool of the World and other Poems (1906)
A Book of Parodies (1908)
Poems by Arthur Symons in 2 volumes (1911)
Knave of Hearts (1913). Poems written between 1894 and 1908.
The Toy Cart (1916). A Play.
Tristan and Iseult: A Play in Four Acts (1917)
Tragedies (1922)
Love's Cruelty (1923)
Jezebel Mort, and other poems (1931)

Essays
An Introduction to the study of Browning (1886)
Studies in Two Literatures (1897)
Aubrey Beardsley: An Essay with a Preface (1898)
The Symbolist Movement in Literature (1899; 1919 revised and enlarged)
Cities (1903), word-pictures of Rome, Venice, Naples, Seville, etc.
Plays, Acting and Music (1903)
Studies in Prose and Verse (1904)
Studies in Seven Arts (1906)
William Blake (1907)
Dante Gabriel Rossetti [International Art Series No. I] (1910)
Figures of Several Centuries (1916)
Cities and Sea-Coasts and Islands (1918)
Colour Studies in Paris (1918)
"The Gateway to an Artificial Paradise: The Effects of Hashish and Opium Compared" (1918)
Studies in the Elizabethan Drama (1919)
Charles Baudelaire: A Study (1920)
Dramatis Personae (1925 – US edition 1923)
The Cafe Royal and other Essays (1923)
Notes on Joseph Conrad with some Unpublished Letters (1925)
From Toulouse-Lautrec to Rodin (1929)
Studies in Strange Souls (1929). Studies of Rossetti and Swinburne.
Confessions: A Study in Pathology (1930). A book containing Symons's description of his breakdown and treatment.
Wanderings (1931)
A Study of Walter Pater (1932)

Fiction
Spiritual Adventures (1905).
 With an autobiographical sketch and extracts from the 'Life of Lucy Newcome' based on his lover 'Muriel' (Edith Broadbent)
includes the short story "Esther Kahn" which was developed into the film Esther Kahn.

References

External links

 
 
 
 
Poems by Arthur Symons
Selected poems by Arthur William Symons
Snakeskin: The Arthur Symons Page: includes several poems by Symons
London nights Cornell University Library Historical Monographs Collection.  {Reprinted by} Cornell University Library Digital Collections
 Arthur Symons Papers at the Columbia University Rare Book and Manuscript Library, New York, NY
Finding aid to Karl Beckson papers on Arthur Symons on Samuel Beckett at Columbia University. Rare Book & Manuscript Library.
The Toy Cart by Arthur Symons on Great War Theatre
Arthur Symons Collection. General Collection, Beinecke Rare Book and Manuscript Library, Yale University.

1865 births
1945 deaths
British poets
People from Milford Haven
British male poets